Bidgood is a surname. Notable people with the surname include:

Harry Bidgood (1898–1957), English composer, dance band leader and musical director for films
Jack Bidgood (1902–1975), Australian rules footballer
James Bidgood (politician) (born 1959), Australian politician, member of the House of Representatives for the seat of Dawson, in north Queensland
James Bidgood (filmmaker) (1933–2022), American contemporary artist living and working in New York City
John Bidgood (1914–2001), British Conservative Party politician
Ruth Bidgood (born 1922), Welsh poet
Sally Bidgood (1948–2018), British botanist
Thomas Bidgood (1858–1925), English composer and conductor

See also
The Adventure of Faustus Bidgood, surreal Canadian comedy film, released in 1986